Robert McDonald Jones (October 1, 1808 – February 22, 1872) was a Choctaw senator and prominent Confederate politician. He was born in Mississippi and later relocated to Indian Territory.  He was educated at the Choctaw Academy in Blue Springs, Kentucky, where he received a diploma signed by future Vice President Richard Mentor Johnson.
During the removal of Choctaws to Indian Territory, he accepted a contract and worked as translator for the United States to the tribe.  He also led a removal party that included a large party of livestock.  After removal, Jones opened several trading posts along the Red River.  In addition to stores, Jones ran several large plantations, growing cotton and several other crops.  In 1849, Jones exported 700 bales of cotton, which he shipped to New Orleans in one of his two Steamships ("RM Jones" and "Frances").  Jones built two sprawling mansions on his plantations Lake West and Rose Hill, complete with luxurious furnishings from around the world.  According to the 1860 census, Jones owned over 230 slaves, though some have argued that he owned as many as 500.

At the outbreak of the Civil War, Jones argued vehemently for secession and an alliance between the Choctaws and Confederacy. He represented the Choctaw nation in the First Confederate Congress from 1862 to 1864.  Following the War, he served as a Choctaw delegate in Washington DC in negotiating the Treaty of 1866 between the Choctaws and the United States; however, he refused to sign the treaty and left before it was complete.

He died from malaria in 1872 and was buried outside his Rose Hill estate alongside several of his children who died in infancy and his second wife, Susan Colbert Jones. Rose Hill later burned, destroying much of his letters and papers.  In 1933, a dedication of the Jones graveyard, including the installation of a brick-wall with the stones from the house, was performed by the Oklahoma Historical Society.

References
 http://politicalgraveyard.com/bio/jones7.html
 https://web.archive.org/web/20171228200820/http://digital.library.okstate.edu/encyclopedia/entries/J/JO022.html

1808 births
1872 deaths
Arkansas Democrats
Members of the Confederate States House of Representatives
Choctaw Nation of Oklahoma politicians
19th-century Native American politicians
Native Americans in the American Civil War
Native American slave owners
People of Indian Territory